Viļaka Municipality is a former municipality in Latgale, Latvia. The municipality was formed in 2009 by merging Kuprava Parish, Medņeva Parish, Susāji Parish, Šķilbēni Parish, Vecumi Parish, Žīguri Parish and Viļaka town; the administrative centre being Viļaka. The population in 2020 was 4,472.

On 1 July 2021, Viļaka Municipality ceased to exist and its territory was merged into Balvi Municipality.

See also 
 Administrative divisions of Latvia (2009)

References 

 
Former municipalities of Latvia
Latgale